The national emblem of the Nakhchivan Autonomous Soviet Socialist Republic was adopted in 1937 by the government of the Nakhchivan Autonomous Soviet Socialist Republic. The emblem almost is identical to the emblem of the Azerbaijan Soviet Socialist Republic.

History 
The emblem was described in the Article 111 of the Constitution of the Nakhchivan Autonomous Soviet Socialist Republic adopted on September 18, 1937 by the Extraordinary X Congress of Soviets of the Nakhchivan Autonomous Soviet Socialist Republic (approved on April 7, 1941 by the Fourth Session of the Supreme Council of the Azerbaijan SSR). The article contained the following description:

First revision 

On August 25, 1938 (according to other sources - July 28, 1939) in this description, the words "and Armenian" were replaced by the words "and Russian" and the coat of arms of the Nakhchivan ASSR began to differ from the coat of arms of the Azerbaijan SSR by the name of the 
Autonomous Republic in Azerbaijani and Russian languages on lower tape interceptions.

Second revision 

In accordance with the Law of the Azerbaijan SSR "On the Transfer of Azerbaijani Writing from the Latin to the Russian Alphabet" adopted on July 11, 1939, the writing of the Azerbaijani language from January 1, 1940 was translated from the Latin alphabet into the alphabet on the basis of the Russian alphabet, in which the inscriptions in the coat of arms of Nakhchivan was changed

Third revision 

In connection with the change in the Azerbaijani language of the word "autonomous" since 1945, the abbreviation "MSSR" instead of the abbreviation "ASSR" was depicted instead of the abbreviation "MSSR". 

This version of the emblem has not changed after the adoption in 1978 of the new Constitution of the Nakhchivan ASSR.

Gallery 

Nakhchivan ASSR
Nakhchivan Autonomous Soviet Socialist Republic
Nakhchivan ASSR
Nakhchivan ASSR
Nakhchivan ASSR
Nakhchivan ASSR
Nakhchivan ASSR
Nakhchivan ASSR
Nakhchivan ASSR